Bruno Miguel Guerreiro Costa (born 28 August 1986 in Ferreiras, Albufeira, Algarve) is a Portuguese footballer who plays for F.C. Ferreiras as a goalkeeper.

References

External links

1986 births
Living people
People from Albufeira
Sportspeople from Faro District
Portuguese footballers
Association football goalkeepers
Segunda Divisão players
S.L. Benfica B players
Odivelas F.C. players
Clube Oriental de Lisboa players
Atlético S.C. players
C.D. Fátima players
CD Operário players
S.C. Farense players
Liga II players
CS Otopeni players
Segunda División B players
CD Badajoz players
Portugal youth international footballers
Portuguese expatriate footballers
Expatriate footballers in Romania
Expatriate footballers in Spain
Portuguese expatriate sportspeople in Romania
Portuguese expatriate sportspeople in Spain